Milagros de la Torre is a New York-based artist working with a conceptual approach to the photographic medium since 1991.  Her images involve critical research on the history and technical procedures of the photographic, and examine representations of trauma, its residual effect on the individual, and the structures of remembrance.

She studied Communications Sciences at the University of Lima and received a B.A. (Hons) in Photographic Arts from the London College of Communication, University of the Arts London.

Career
Since 1991, de la Torre has worked with photographic media. Her first solo exhibition, curated by Robert Delpire, was presented at the Palais de Tokyo, Paris. She received the Rockefeller Foundation Artist Grant and was awarded the Romeo Martinez Photography Prize and the Young Iberoamerican Creators Prize. In 2003, her artist book Trouble de la Vue was published by Toluca Editions, Paris.  De la Torre  received the Guggenheim Fellowship in 2011, the Dora Maar Fellowship from The Brown Foundation in 2014, The Peter S. Reed Foundation Photography Award and was the recipient of a "Merited Person of Culture Award" from the Minister of Culture in Peru in 2016.

Her work has been exhibited broadly and is part of permanent museum collections in America and Europe. In 2012, the Americas Society, N.Y. presented ‘Observed’, a solo show curated by Edward J. Sullivan, and the Museo de Arte de Lima, MALI honored her with a mid-career retrospective exhibition.

Awards and honors
Rockefeller Foundation, Romeo Martinez Photography Prize, Young Ibero-American Creators Prize (Photography), Guggenheim Fellowship, Dora Maar Fellowship, The Brown Foundation, The Peter S Reed Foundation Photography Award (2016), and was the recipient of a "Merited Person of Culture Award" from the Minister of Culture in Peru (2016).

References

Peruvian photographers
Peruvian women photographers
Living people
Year of birth missing (living people)
People from Lima
University of Lima alumni
Alumni of the London College of Printing